Tang-e Chowgan may refer to:
Tang-e Chowgan-e Olya, a village in Iran
Tang-e Chowgan-e Olya-ye Kashkuli, a village in Iran
Tang-e Chowgan-e Sofla, a village in Iran
Tang-e Chowgan-e Sofla-ye Dar Shuri, a village in Iran
Tang-e Chowgan-e Vosta, a village in Iran